Rosenlewin Urheilijat-38 (Finnish for Rosenlew Athletes-38) was a Finnish sports club based in Pori. Its sections included football from 1945 to 1967. RU-38 was disestablished when it was merged with Porin Karhut to form Porin Ässät hockey club and Porin Ässät football club.

History 
RU-38 was established in Pori in 1938 by Oy W.Rosenlew Ab. The sections of the club included football from the start but it didn't play any games until 1947. It played in the Maakuntasarja. Arguably RU-38's best players in the 50s were Stig-Göran Myntti, Matti Jokinen and Seppo Pelkonen.

Years at the top 
RU-38 was promoted to the Mestaruussarja, the top tier of football at the time, in 1959. The first season was a success as the team was placed 2nd in the series.

References 
 Suomen jalkapallomuseo

Specific

Defunct football clubs in Finland
Association football clubs established in 1938
Association football clubs disestablished in 1967
1938 establishments in Finland
1967 disestablishments in Finland
Ässät